Bharti is an indian surname in the caste of Brahmin Goswami. They are known for their contribution in the Vedas. They have huge respect at the time of raja and maharajas.

efer to:

Companies
 Bharti Enterprises, a business conglomerate based in New Delhi, India
 Bharti Airtel, an Indian global telecommunications services company based in New Delhi, India

People
Given name
 Bharti Singh (born 1984),  Indian stand-up comedian and actress
 Sunil Bharti Mittal (born 1957), Indian businessman

Surname
 Divya Bharti (1974–1993), Indian actress
 Prabha Bharti (fl. 1960s-1990s), one of the first Indian women qawaali singers 
 Somnath Bharti (born 1974), Indian lawyer and politician

Other uses
 Bharati (research station) - an Antarctic research station commissioned by India

See also
 Barty, a surname and nickname
 Bhārata, alternative name for India
 Bharati (disambiguation)